is a Japanese video game director and designer, best known as the creator of the Silent Hill, Siren and Gravity Rush franchises.

Biography 
Toyama was born in 1970 in Miyazaki Prefecture, and studied art in Tokyo Zokei University. After graduating he joined Konami in 1994 as a graphic artist. He was the graphic designer and character designer for the Sega CD version of Snatcher and International Track & Field, and after that he created the Silent Hill series. The game was successful and produced various sequels, but Toyama left Team Silent in 1999 after the first game was launched to join Japan Studio afterwards to work on the Siren series. He directed the video games Siren (2003) and its sequel Forbidden Siren 2 (2006). In 2008, Toyama released Siren: Blood Curse, a reimagining of the original Siren game. Toyama then worked on the PlayStation Vita game Gravity Rush, released in 2012. A sequel, Gravity Rush 2, was released on January 19, 2017, in Japan.

Toyama left Sony Japan Studio in September 2020. He has founded Bokeh Game Studio alongside Kazunobu Sato and Junya Okura, both of whom worked on the Siren series, on August 13, 2020. When asked about what prompted the move, Toyama stated that he had been inspired by fellow designer Fumito Ueda who had related much of his experiences founding genDESIGN to Toyama. Toyama announced that he plans on returning to the horror genre, with a debut game inspired in particular by film directors Wong Kar-wai and Fruit Chan. The game, Slitterhead, was formally revealed during The Game Awards 2021.

Works

Awards 
In 2012 Toyama received the outstanding performance award at the 16th Japan Media Arts Festival and the excellence award at the Japan Game Awards for his work on Gravity Rush.

References

External links 
 Interview with Toyama on Siren: Blood Curse

1970 births
People from Miyazaki Prefecture
Japanese video game designers
Japanese video game directors
Konami people
Living people
Sony Interactive Entertainment people
Video game artists
Video game writers
Tokyo Zokei University alumni